The Bogotá International Half Marathon, or mmB as it is traditionally known, is an annual road running competition over a half marathon distance taking place in Bogotá, Colombia in late July or early August, first held in 2000.  The competition features both elite and popular (or recreational) sections within the half marathon and 10K races. Around 45,000 runners take part in the competition's events each year.

Both the half marathon and the 10K start and finish in Simón Bolívar Park.

The half marathon holds World Athletics Platinum Label Road Race status, making it the first and thus far only South American race to achieve this accreditation.

History 
The race was first held in 2000.

The elite race has featured a number of high-profile runners, including former marathon world record holder and champion Catherine Ndereba, two-time Saint Silvester Road Race winner James Kwambai, Olympic medallist and New York City Marathon champion Joyce Chepchumba and 2005 World Half Marathon champion Fabiano Joseph.

The 2020 edition of the race was postponed to 2021.07.25 due to the coronavirus pandemic.

Course 
In 2010, both the half marathon and the 10K had a point-to-point format. The half marathon course started at Bolívar Square and headed north past Avenida Jiménez and Parque Nacional, before turning west at Unicentro shopping centre. The course continued heading west, passing the Salitre Mágico amusement park, and finished at Simón Bolívar Park. The 10K race had identical start and finishing points, but followed a more direct path between the two – heading north on Calle 26 then switching to Calle 53 which goes directly past Bolívar Park.

By 2013, the courses for both races had changed so that they both started and ended at Simón Bolívar Park.

The race is not typically conducive to fast times as the city is located at 2,600 meters above sea level, some 8,530 feet, a factor which inhibits long distance runners. However, it is considered a perfect training ground for professional athletes and runners looking to run the World's Marathon Majors in Berlin, Chicago and New York happening in the fall each year.

Winners 

Key:

Half marathon

Notes

References

External links
Official website

Half marathons
Recurring sporting events established in 2000
Half Marathon
Athletics in Colombia